Maria João may refer to:
 Maria João (singer)
 Maria João (model)

See also